Jabłonka  is a village in the administrative district of Gmina Śliwice, within Tuchola County, Kuyavian-Pomeranian Voivodeship, in north-central Poland.

In the years 1975-1998 the administrative district belonged to the Bydgoszcz Voivodship

References

Villages in Tuchola County